The Evandale Ferry is a cable ferry in the Canadian province of New Brunswick. The ferry carries New Brunswick Route 124 across the Saint John River, linking Kars on the east bank to Evandale on the west bank.

The ferry carries up to 15 cars at a time, and operates 24 hours a day all year. It is operated by the New Brunswick Department of Transportation. The department has a ferry maintenance yard by the ferry's eastern terminus.

See also
List of crossings of the Saint John River

References

External links
Official ferries web page of the New Brunswick Department of Transportation

Ferries of New Brunswick
Crossings of the Saint John River (Bay of Fundy)
Cable ferries in Canada